Utricularia petersoniae is a small annual carnivorous plant that belongs to the genus Utricularia. U. petersoniae, a lithophyte, is endemic to the Mexican state of Guerrero. It was first published and described by Peter Taylor in 1986. It is named in honor of Kathleen M. Peterson, one of the collectors who first discovered this species.

See also 
 List of Utricularia species

References 

Carnivorous plants of North America
Flora of Guerrero
petersoniae